Tony Hunt is an Irish lawyer who is currently a Judge of the High Court and is the senior presiding judge of the Special Criminal Court. He was previously a barrister and a Judge of the Circuit Court between 2007 and 2014.

Education 
Hunt attended University College Dublin from where he obtained a BCL degree in 1984. He subsequently attended the King's Inns to study to become a barrister.

Legal career 
Hunt was called to the Bar in 1986. He was an appointee of the Bar Council to the Superior Court Rules Committee.

Much of his practice was spent appearing in criminal trials as prosecuting counsel for the Director of Public Prosecutions. He acted in trials involving assault, sexual assault, manslaughter, drugs offences, and tax offences. He acted for defendants in traffic offences, and sexual assault cases.

Hunt also represented clients in cases involving injunctions, contracts, and personal injuries.

Judicial career

Circuit Court 
His career as judge began in May 2007 when he became a Judge of the Circuit Court. From March 2012, he was assigned to the Midland Circuit.

He was a member of the Circuit Court Rules Committee. He replaced Yvonne Murphy as a member of the Working Group on Efficiency Measures in the Criminal Justice System for the Circuit and District Courts in February 2012.

High Court 
Hunt was elevated to the High Court in October 2014, coinciding with multiple vacancies created on the court following the creation by the Court of Appeal.

He frequently hears cases from the Central Criminal Court, including those involving murder, manslaughter, and rape. He has also heard extradition applications. During 2015, he was the judge in the trial of Graham Dwyer arising out of the murder of Elaine O'Hara. The trial lasted 46 days and attracted much media and public attention.

He is the senior presiding judge of the Special Criminal Court. He has heard cases concerning dissident republicanism and the Hutch–Kinahan feud, including the shooting of Gareth Hutch, Dessie O'Hare, and the kidnapping of Kevin Lunney. In May 2020, he described the Kinahan organisation as having a "hierarchical structure" containing "cells and sub-cells" to engage in "execution-type murders" related to international "organised drugs and firearm trafficking". This was the first time a judge had outlined the organisation in such a way in court.

References

Living people
High Court judges (Ireland)
Circuit Court (Ireland) judges
Alumni of University College Dublin
Irish barristers
Alumni of King's Inns
21st-century Irish lawyers
Year of birth missing (living people)